Zarechny is a rural locality (a settlement) in Grodekovsky Selsoviet of Blagoveshchensky District, Amur Oblast, Russia. The population was 151 as of 2018. There are 8 streets.

Geography 
Zarechny is located 19 km east of Blagoveshchensk (the district's administrative centre) by road. Zazeysky is the nearest rural locality.

References 

Rural localities in Blagoveshchensky District, Amur Oblast